is a Japanese musician and composer best known for his work on various anime television series. He started his musical career at the age of 14 when he first started playing the guitar. After winning a guitar contest three years later, he decided to become a professional musician and later graduated from Kunitachi College of Music.

In 2013, he was given the role of lead composer for the first time with Hyperdimension Neptunia: The Animation. Since Hyperdimension Neptunia: The Animation, he has composed many series, including Dr. Stone, Jujutsu Kaisen, and Teasing Master Takagi-san.

Biography
Hiroaki Tsutsumi was born in Tokyo on June 5, 1985, and began his musical career when he first started playing the guitar at the age of 14 after many of his peers started playing the instrument themselves. At the age of 17, he won a guitar contest, which became the reason he decided to become a professional musician.

Before graduating, Tsutsumi worked a bit with Masaru Yokoyama, who influenced Tsutsumi to try composing for other works. In 2013, Tsutsumi was put in charge of composing for the first time with the anime television series for the Hyperdimension Neptunia media franchise. In 2019, the anime adaptation of Dr. Stone was nominated for best anime soundtrack at the Crunchyroll Anime Awards, which Tsutsumi co-composed. In 2021, the anime adaptation of Jujutsu Kaisen won anime of the year at the Crunchyroll Anime Awards, which Tsutsumi also co-composed.

Works

TV series
 Hyperdimension Neptunia: The Animation (2013) (composer with Kenji Kaneko and Masaru Yokoyama)
 I Couldn't Become a Hero, So I Reluctantly Decided to Get a Job. (2013) (composer with Masaru Yokoyama)
 Meganebu! (2013) (composer with Keiko Osaki and Shota Hashimoto)
 Blue Spring Ride (2014) (composer with Keiko Osaki and Shota Hashimoto)
 Monster Musume (2015) (composer)
 Lance N' Masques (2015) (composer) 
 Valkyrie Drive: Mermaid (2015) (composer)
 Kuromukuro (2016) (composer)
 Orange (2016) (composer)
 Long Riders! (2016–2017) (composer)
 Akashic Records of Bastard Magic Instructor (2017) (composer)
 Seven Mortal Sins (2017) (composer with Masaru Yokoyama)
 Clean Freak! Aoyama-kun (2017) (composer)
 Children of the Whales (2017) (composer)
 Teasing Master Takagi-san (2018–2022) (composer)
 Anima Yell! (2018) (composer with manzo)
 Ao-chan Can't Study! (2019) (composer)
 Dr. Stone (2019–present) (composer with Tatsuya Kato and Yuki Kanesaka)
 Ahiru no Sora (2019–2020) (composer)
 Actors: Songs Connection (2019) (composer with Hideakira Kimura and Tomotaka Ōsumi)
 Jujutsu Kaisen (2020–2021) (composer with Yoshimasa Terui and Alisa Okehazama)
 By the Grace of the Gods (2020–present) (composer)
 Koikimo (2021) (composer)
 Tokyo Revengers (2021–2023) (composer)
 My Senpai Is Annoying (2021) (composer)
 Shikimori's Not Just a Cutie (2022) (composer)
 The Tale of the Outcasts (2023) (composer with Kana Hashiguchi)

Films
 Jujutsu Kaisen 0 (2021) (composer with Yoshimasa Terui and Alisa Okehazama) 
 Teasing Master Takagi-san: The Movie (2022) (composer)

Web series
 Monster Strike the Animation (2018) (composer with Masaru Yokoyama, Nobuaki Nobusawa, and Moe Hyūga)

Original video animation
 Alice in Borderland (2014–2015) (composer)

Albums
 Some Dreams (2018) (guitar playing)

References

External links
 Official Miracle Bus profile 
 

1985 births
21st-century Japanese composers
21st-century Japanese male musicians
Anime composers
Japanese film score composers
Japanese male film score composers
Japanese music arrangers
Japanese television composers
Kunitachi College of Music alumni
Living people
Male television composers
Musicians from Tokyo